Jay Lance Bachman (born December 8, 1945) is a former American football player.  He graduated from Ross High School and played college football at the University of Cincinnati, where he was a center, and then played professionally in the American Football League for the Denver Broncos in 1968 and 1969 seasons and for the Broncos of the National Football League in the 1970 and 1971 seasons.

See also
List of American Football League players

External links
AFL and NFL stats

1945 births
Living people
Sportspeople from Hamilton, Ohio
Players of American football from Ohio
American football centers
Cincinnati Bearcats football players
Denver Broncos (AFL) players
Denver Broncos players